Eldar Hansen  (born 7 November 1941) is a Norwegian former football player and leader.

He was born in Trondheim. He played for the club Rosenborg BK, and won the Norwegian Football Cup twice with Rosenborg, in 1960 and 1964. He was capped once and scored one goal for the Norwegian national team. He served as president of the Football Association of Norway  from 1980 to 1987.

References

External links

1941 births
Living people 
Footballers from Trondheim
Norwegian footballers
Norway international footballers
Rosenborg BK players 
Norwegian sports executives and administrators
Rosenborg BK non-playing staff
Association football forwards